A statue of Charlie Chaplin is installed in Shanghai's New Town Central Park in China.

See also
 Statue of Charlie Chaplin, London

External links
 

Cultural depictions of Charlie Chaplin
Monuments and memorials in China
Outdoor sculptures in Shanghai
Sculptures of men in China
Statues in China
Changning District